Fredericks may refer to:

 Fredericks (surname), a surname
 Fredericks Foundation, a British charity

See also

 Frederick
 Frederick's
 Fredricks